Cairo Road is a 1950 British crime film directed by David MacDonald and starring Eric Portman, Laurence Harvey, Maria Mauban, Harold Lang and John Gregson.

Plot
A team of Egyptian anti-narcotic agents led by Colonel Youssef Bey (Eric Portman), the chief of the Anti-Narcotic Bureau, and his new assistant Lieutenant Mourad (Laurence Harvey), recently relocated from Paris with his wife Marie (Maria Mauban), try to prevent shipments of drugs crossing the southern Egyptian border. They are constantly on alert as even camel caravans are suspect in smuggling narcotics.

The agents are investigating the murder of a rich Arab businessman named Bashiri. Raiding a berthed ship in the harbour of Port Saïd leads them to the trail of heroin smugglers, including Rico Pavlis (Harold Lang) and Lombardi (Grégoire Aslan). One of the police agents, Anna Michelis (Camelia), is targeted by the smugglers.

Eventually Pavlis turns on his partner, killing Lombardi, but Youssef sets a trap for the Pavlis brothers, and the capture of the two remaining criminal gang leaders and their men, proves the police are competent at stemming the flow of narcotics.

Cast

 Eric Portman as Colonel Youssef Bey
 Laurence Harvey as Lieutenant Mourad
 Maria Mauban as Marie
 Harold Lang as Humble/Rico Pavlis 
 Grégoire Aslan as Lombardi
 Karel Stepanek as Edouardo Pavlis
 John Bailey as Doctor 
 Martin Boddey as Major Ahmed Mustafa
 John Gregson as Coast guard
 Marne Maitland as Gohari
 John Harvey as Major Maggoury
 Abraham Sofaer as Commandant
 Peter Jones as Ship's Lieutenant
 Camelia as Anna Michelis

Production
The film was based on real cases worked on by the Egyptian police. Producer Maxwell Setton had been born in Cairo. It was originally known as Poison Road and was made with the co-operation of the Egyptian government.

The production was centred around Egypt where principal photography took place, and its cast included Egyptian film star Camelia, who died in 1950 in an aircraft crash.

Reception
Cairo Road received a reasonably positive review from The New York Times, who called it an "unpretentious and consistently sensible little film... British restraint and taste not only have saved the day but succeeded in dignifying a battered subject... this routine picture has some sterling ingredients."

The critic from Variety said "action moves slowly in the first half and much of the story is veiled so as to obscure the plot. However, it winds up with a meaty climax."

In a review in the Time Out Film Guide by Trevor Johnston, Cairo Road is described as "a workaday thriller, whose makers actually took the rouble to go to Cairo and Port Said to shoot it. Twenty-something Harvey makes an early appearance as Inspector Portman's bumbling, keen-as-mustard assistant."

References

Notes

Bibliography

 Pym, John, ed. Time Out Film Guide. London: Penguin Group, 2004. .

External links
 
 

1950 films
1950 crime drama films
British black-and-white films
British crime drama films
Films about the illegal drug trade
Films directed by David MacDonald (director)
Films set in Egypt
Police detective films
1950s English-language films
1950s British films